Possessed is an album by the American klezmer group the Klezmatics, released in 1997.

Production
The album was produced by Robert Musso. "Moroccan Game" is an instrumental. 

The second half contains the band's score to Tony Kushner's A Dybbuk, or Between Two Worlds. Kushner also penned the liner notes.

Critical reception

Robert Christgau opined that "this is a vision band with a genre, not a genre band with a vision." The Advocate wrote that "there's a heaviness to the Klezmatics that's anathema to ordinary klezmer music, which by its very nature and function is escapist, even as it celebrates cultural cohesion."

The Windsor Star stated that "the clarinet wails, the fiddle and horns sing, the beat is incessant, and the Yiddish vocals transcend the language barrier." The Chicago Tribune thought that "Alicia Svigals' violin is a revelation, and Lorin Sklamberg's vocals—which can be as sublime as a cantor's or as sly as a drunk's—evoke the Jewish diaspora in both divine and uniquely American terms."

AllMusic wrote that "while there is plenty of their familiar frenzied spiritual party music, there is also some goregeously evocative minor-key mysticism."

Track listing 
 Shprayz Ikh Mir
 Kolomeyke
 Moroccan Game
 An Undoing World
 Mizmor Shir Lehanef (Reefer Song)
 Shvartz Un Vays (Black and White)
 Lomir Heybn Dem Bekher
 Sirba Matey Matey
 Mipney Ma
 Beggars' Dance
 Shnaps-Nign
 Interlude
 Dybbuk Shers
 Fradde's Song
 Der Shvatser Mi Adir (The Black Benediction)
 Hinokh Yafo
 Mipney Ma (reprise)

References

The Klezmatics albums
1997 albums